Lengshuijiang East railway station is a third-class railway station in Lengshuijiang, Loudi, Hunan on the Shanghai–Kunming railway. It was built in 1961 and is under the jurisdiction of China Railway Guangzhou Group.

References

Railway stations in China opened in 1961
Railway stations in Hunan
Railway stations in Loudi
Stations on the Shanghai–Kunming Railway